Jean-François Mocquard (1791-1864) was a French lawyer and politician. He served as a member of the French Senate from 1863 to 1864. He also served as the chief-of-staff to Emperor Napoleon III. He was buried at the Père Lachaise Cemetery.

References

1791 births
1864 deaths
Politicians from Bordeaux
Lawyers from Bordeaux
French Senators of the Second Empire
19th-century French lawyers